Tetney Lock is a part of Tetney, East Lindsey, Lincolnshire, England.
The East side of the canal leads out to the North Sea, and the West Side leads to Louth.
It is a popular fishing and kayaking location.
A pub, called "The Crown and Anchor" also lies near the water source.

Geography of Lincolnshire